Jefferson Township is one of the fourteen townships of Madison County, Ohio, United States.  The 2000 census found 6,935 people in the township, 2,604 of whom lived in the unincorporated portions of the township.

Geography
Located in the eastern part of the county, it borders the following townships:
Canaan Township - north
Brown Township, Franklin County - northeast
Prairie Township, Franklin County - east
Pleasant Township, Franklin County - northwest
Fairfield Township - south
Union Township - southwest corner
Deer Creek Township - west
Monroe Township - northwest

The village of West Jefferson is located in central Jefferson Township.

Name and history
It is one of twenty-four Jefferson Townships statewide.

Government
The township is governed by a three-member board of trustees, who are elected in November of odd-numbered years to a four-year term beginning on the following January 1. Two are elected in the year after the presidential election and one is elected in the year before it. There is also an elected township fiscal officer, who serves a four-year term beginning on April 1 of the year after the election, which is held in November of the year before the presidential election. Vacancies in the fiscal officership or on the board of trustees are filled by the remaining trustees.

References

External links
County website

Townships in Madison County, Ohio
Townships in Ohio